Kevin McDonald (born 1992) is an Irish hurler who plays for Carlow Senior Championship club Mount Leinster Rangers and at inter-county level with the Carlow senior hurling team. He has lined out in both defence and as a forward.

Career

McDonald first came to hurling prominence at juvenile and underage levels with the Mount Leinster Rangers club in Borris. He eventually progressed onto the club's senior team and has won three Carlow SHC titles. McDonald first appeared on the inter-county scene during a two-year stint with the Carlow minor hurling team before later lining out with the under-21 team. He made his senior debut in 2016 and was part of the Carlow team that won the Christy Ring Cup and Joe McDonagh Cup titles. McDonald has also shared in a National League Division 2A success.

Career statistics

Honours

Mount Leinster Rangers
Carlow Senior Hurling Championship: 2017, 2018, 2020

Carlow
Joe McDonagh Cup: 2018
Christy Ring Cup: 2017
National Hurling League Division 2A: 2018

References

1997 births
Living people
Mount Leinster Rangers hurlers
Carlow inter-county hurlers